3502 may refer to:

The year in the 36th century
3502 Huangpu asteroid
Hirth 3502 two stroke aircraft engine